Sex- and gender-related slurs

English profanity
Homophobic slurs